Already responsible for a raft of drum'n'bass classics recorded throughout the '90s, Ram Recordings' bosses Andy C and Ant Miles - formerly known as Origin Unknown - united with fellow Ram producer Shimon to form Ram Trilogy. Fittingly, the three debuted with a trio of epic singles during the last half of 1998, the industrial-strength anthems "No Reality/Scanners," followed by "Mind Overload/Intercity" and "Chase Scene/Terminal 1." All three singles took as their template the darkstep style becoming increasingly ubiquitous throughout the jungle scene (a sound pioneered by Origin Unknown themselves), but advanced the cause considerably with a legion of future-shock beats and effects. A year later, the notoriously media-shy team emerged from the underground with the first full-length ever released on Ram Recordings, Molten Beats.

 
In 2003, Ram Trilogy released the Screamer EP on vinyl, including the tracks "Skittles" and "Evolution" (Marcus Intalex & ST Files Remix).

In 2008, Ram Trilogy had a song released on Audioporn Records, on the EP The Quarks entitled "Asylum".

In 2020, Ram Trilogy released a new album, Revolutions. 

Remixes

References

External links
 
 
 https://ramrecords.com/news/14827/ram-trilogy-revolutions-lp

British drum and bass music groups